Gilchrest is a surname. Notable people with the surname include:

 Wayne Gilchrest (born 1946), American politician
 Jillian Gilchrest (born 1982), American politician

See also
 Gilchrist (surname)
 Gilchrest, New Hampshire